Tim Timebomb is a music project by Tim Armstrong, best known as a member of the punk rock band Rancid. Armstrong has recorded a large number of songs – a mixture of cover versions, including Rancid covers, and original songs, including some tracks from his musical film project RocknNRoll Theater – with a variety of supporting musicians.

A selection of the material was first released as a download only album Tim Timebomb Sings Songs from RocknNRoll Theater – this consisting of original songs featured in Armstrong's musical film series "RockNRoll Theatre". Starting on October 29, 2012, a series of digital singles have also been released, on a daily basis. These singles are initially being released via YouTube, with one song each day being released from October 29, 2012, onwards, and then being made available for download via iTunes. To date, all of the tracks from the RockNRollTheatre album have also been included in the series of singles, with the exception of the track "Let's Fuck".

Choice of music
According to Armstrong's website:

Tim Timebomb and Friends is a place for me to share with you some of my favorite songs that I've recorded with friends of mine. I've always enjoyed sharing music, whether I'm just sitting around playing acoustic guitar with my friends or breaking out old 45's. I guess you could call me a music nerd. I like everything from Bob Dylan to the Ramones, to Jimmy Cliff to Cock Sparrer. I plan to bring together a great group of players to record covers as well as some originals. I hope you dig it and encourage you to pass them on.

All of Armstrong's bandmates in Rancid appear along with Ryan Foltz, formerly of Dropkick Murphys, Travis Barker and members of The Interrupters and The Ohio Ramblers. Three of the album's songs, "That's Just The Way It Is Now", which was featured on Rancid's 2009 album, Let the Dominoes Fall, "I'm Real" and "No More Living" were written by Armstrong in 2007 while in Spain and are inspired by the classic 1964 Vincent Price movie, The Last Man on Earth which was based on the 1954 novel, I Am Legend.

Albums

Tim Timebomb Sings RocknRoll Theater

The album features versions of  songs from the RockNRoll Theatre film series, which is produced by Armstrong. 13 of the 14 tracks have also been released as digital singles.

Armstrong sings the lead vocals on all songs, in contrast to the versions in the films, which are sung by the actors, including Lars Frederiksen and Davey Havok.

Track list:
All songs written by Tim Armstrong.

We Did Alright
Guardian Angel
No Reverence
Honor Is All We Know
Just For Tonight
Change That Song Mr. DJ
Running Out Of Time
Skeleton Crew
This Time We Got It Right
Everything I Need
Oh Hollywood
No More Living
Let's Fuck
Misconceptions

2013–2014 Pirates Press Records Releases

7" singles

She's Drunk All The Time b/w Tulare

30 Pieces of Silver b/w Ooh La La

Change That Song Mr. DJ b/w Guardian Angel

Three 12 song collections from below singles released as a bundle packs on CD and vinyl via Pirates Press Records

High Noon In A Dark Blue Sea

Honor Is All We Know
Change That Song Mr. DJ
She Goes To Finos
Do What You Want
I Wanna Get Rid Of You
Children's Bread
In The City
Television
Oh No
No Reverence 
Guardian Angel
Cupid Aims

Winding Far Down

30 Pieces Of Silver
Let's Do Rocksteady
Too Much Pressure
Summer of '69
Concrete Jungle
Lip Up Fatty
Working
Ohh La La
This Time We Got It Right
Just For Tonight
Ruby Soho
Saturday Night At The Movies

Special Lunacy

She's Drunk All The Time
Chill's And Fever
Rock This Joint
Till The Well Runs Dry
Jim Dandy
Yes Sir
I'm Movin' On
My Buckets Got A Hole In It
Adalida
Thanks A Lot
I'm Going Down
Blue Skies

Singles

Recording Personnel
Tim Armstrong  – Lead vocals, lead & rhythm & acoustic guitar
Lars Fredriksen  – Lead & rhythm guitar, backing vocals
Matt Freeman  – Bass guitar, mandolin, double bass, backing vocals
Branden Steineckert  – Drums, backing vocals
Ryan Foltz  – Mandolin, percussion, melodica, concertina, bass guitar, drums, horns, backing vocals
Kevin Bivona – Guitar, farfisa organ, piano, glockenspiel, B3 organ, bass guitar, accordion, percussion, mandolin, melodica, keyboard, backing vocals, stick bass
Travis Barker  – Drums
Aimee Interrupter – Backing vocals
J Bonner – Bass guitar, organ, guitar, piano
Justin Bivona – Bass guitar, B3 organ, piano, backing vocals
Jesse Bivona – Drums, percussion, backing vocals, guitar
Ben Lythberg  – Percussion
Dan Boer – B3 organ
Pablo Calagero – Saxophone
Tim Hutton – Bass guitar
Dash Hutton – Drums, percussion
Jordis Unga – Whistle, backing vocals
Mark Bush – Trumpet
Ruben Duranz – Trombone
Robby Spengler – Tenor saxophone
Tommy King – B3 organ
John Morrical – Guitar, piano, backing vocals
Dave McKean – Drums, backing vocals
Doug McKean – Bass guitar, guitar
Austin "walkin' cane" Charnanghat – Guitar, resonator guitar
Justin Gorski – Keyboard
Liz Kelly – Backing vocals
James Doyle – Drums
Brett Simons – Bass guitar
Hunter Perrin – Guitar
Jamie T – Backing vocals
Doug Livingston – Pedal steel guitar
Craig Eastman – Fiddle
James King – Saxophone, flute
Jason Myers – Guitar
Patrick Frenchie French – Harmonica
Mark Switzer – Banjo
Becky Stark- Backing vocals
Chris Yohn – Fiddle
Dave Brophy – Drums
Joe McMahon – Bass guitar
Rusty Scott – Piano
Mike Mele – Guitar
John Aruda -Saxophone
Scott Aruda – Trumpet
Jeff Gallindo – Trombone
Brandon Intelligator – Pedal steel guitar
Scott Abels – Drums
Zack Meyerowitz – Trumpet
Nigel Yancey – Saxophone
Korey Horn – Drums
Bevin Hamilton – Backing vocals
Beardo - Bass guitar
Tamir Barzilay- Drums
Darian Polach – Guitar
Ted Russel Kamp – Bass guitar
Dani Llamas – Guitar, backing vocals
Paco Loco – Guitar, piano, keyboard
Pakomoto – Bass guitar
Pablo Minor Boy – Guitar
Salina Cano – Percussion
Jason cool breeze Castillo – Drums
Ruben Durazo – Trombone
Robbie Spengler – Saxophone
Rafa Camison – Drums, percussion
Jeff Moran – Banjo, bass guitar
Patrick Morrison – Guitar
Carlos Reynoso – Washboard, ccoustic guitar
Dominique Rodriguez – Drum/cymbal/block
Brandon Armstrong – Sousaphone
Justin Rubenstein – Trombone
Charles De Castro – Trumpet
Josh Kaufman – Clarinet, piano
Anders Mouridsen – Accordion, banjo, guitar, gang vocals, Dobro, mandolin
Kate Strand – Backing vocals
Mike Bolger – Accordion
Zeke – Barking
Sheena – Barking

Touring Personnel
 Tim Armstrong - Lead Vocals, Lead Guitar
 Elvis Cortez - Guitar, Vocals
 Kevin Bivona - Guitar, B3 Organ, Piano, Vocals
 Justin Bivona - Bass, Vocals
 Jesse Bivona - Drums, Vocals
 Mark Bush - Trumpet, Vocals
 Ruben Durazo - Trombone, Vocals

References

External links 
 Official Tim Timebomb page
 Tim Timebomb YouTube

Tim Armstrong albums
2012 albums
Hellcat Records albums